Kai Oswald (born 29 November 1977 in Geislingen an der Steige) is a German former football player. Oswald is currently the manager of VfB Stuttgart's U16 squad.

He played for five seasons in the Bundesliga for VfB Stuttgart, FC Hansa Rostock and Hannover 96.

Coaching career
Oswald started his coaching career as a youth coach of VfB Stuttgart. After a period as assistant manager for several of the youth teams from U14 to U19, Oswald was in charge of the U15's for two years before he in the summer 2015 was promoted to manager of the U17's.

In November 2015, he was promoted to first team assistant manager under Jürgen Kramny. From the summer 2016, he took charge of the U19's before he at the end of the year took charge of the U16's.

Honours
 DFB-Ligapokal finalist: 1998

References

1977 births
Living people
German footballers
VfB Stuttgart players
VfB Stuttgart II players
FC Hansa Rostock players
Hannover 96 players
MSV Duisburg players
Karlsruher SC players
SpVgg Unterhaching players
FC Carl Zeiss Jena players
Bundesliga players
2. Bundesliga players
Association football defenders